The Nigerian Fourth Republic was initiated on 29 May 1999 after an orderly handover from the military regime of General Abdulsalami Abubakar, with an elected civilian governor for each state holding office for a four-year term.

 1999
Lagos state: Senator Bola Ahmed Tinubu (Executive Governor	May 29, 1999	May 29, 2007)
Ogun state: Chief Olusegun Osoba (Executive Governor	May 29, 1999	May 29, 2003)
Oyo state: Alh Lam Adeshina ( Executive Governor	May 29, 1999	May 29, 2003)

Ekiti state: Adeniyi Adebayo(Executive Governor	May 29, 1999	May 29, 2003)
Ondo state : Adebayo Adefarati(Executive Governor	May 29, 1999	May 29, 2003
Kwara: Muhammad Lawal(Executive Governor May 29, 1999	May 29, 2003)
Abia state:Orji Uzor Kalu (OUK)Executive Governor	May 29, 1999	May 29, 2007